Stereotypes of Asians may refer to:

Stereotypes of East Asians in the United States, ethnic stereotypes of East Asians found in American society as well as other Western societies
Stereotypes of South Asians, oversimplified ethnic stereotypes of South Asian people in Western societies